The Independents – Republic and Territories is a parliamentary group in the Senate including representatives of The Republicans (LR).

History 
According to a report published in L'Opinion on 20 August 2017, Prime Minister Édouard Philippe met with three senators of The Republicans (LR), Fabienne Keller, Jérôme Bignon, and Claude Malhuret, all of whom supported Alain Juppé during the 2016 primary, on 3 August. Starting in mid-May, a group of a dozen LR senators met regularly to discuss the future of "constructives" in the Senate, and continued after the formation of such a group in the National Assembly. Discussions were also held with the centrist group in the Senate, though the consensus ultimately tilted towards the creation of a new group in the Senate, to be founded in mid-September so as to not disrupt the campaign for the 2017 renewal but be prepared to form a group after the elections on 24 September. Keller confirmed the initiative to Le Monde in early September, claiming that about twenty senators close to Juppé and Le Maire were interested in the initiative, enough to form a parliamentary group, and also floated the possibility of other centrist senators joining the presumptive group. The senators described themselves as "humanists, liberals, Europeans, Girondins and open to the questions of society", distant from the conservatives in The Republicans represented by the Fillonist president of the LR group Bruno Retailleau, who hoped to lead the opposition to the policies of Emmanuel Macron in the Senate.

On 14 September, ten LR senators submitted to the Paris Police Prefecture the declaration of the association attached to a future group, and made clear that the members of the group would vote to re-elect LR senator Gérard Larcher as president of the Senate. On 2 October, Claude Malhuret officially announced that he would preside over the newly created Republic and Territories / The Independents group (groupe République et Territoires / Les Indépendants) consisting of 11 senators hoping to defend the centre-right "liberal, European and social" line, with the group officially constituted on 3 October. On 24 October, Malhuret submitted a request to rename it to The Independents – Republic and Territories group (groupe Les Indépendants – République et Territoires), which was accepted during the session the following day.

List of presidents

Historical membership

See also 

The Constructives: Republicans, UDI, and Independents group

References

External links 
 Lists of senators by political group 
 Historical composition of the Senate and political groups 

Senate (France)
Parliamentary groups in France